The 2011–12 Russian Second Division  was the third strongest division in Russian football. The Second Division is geographically divided into 5 zones.
The winners of each zone are automatically promoted into the First Division. The bottom finishers of each zone lose professional status and are relegated into the Amateur Football League.

West

Standings

Top scorers
Source: rfspro.ru 
20 goals
Viktor Svistunov (Petrotrest)
18 goals
Azamat Kurachinov (Sheksna)
17 goals
Dmitri Vakulich (Karelia)
16 goals
Aleksei Antonnikov (Volga)
Fyodor Pronkov (Saturn)
15 goals
Murat Khotov (Dnepr / Petrotrest)

Center

Standings

Top scorers
Source: rfspro.ru 
20 goals
Aleksandr Kutyin (Metallurg)
18 goals
Yevgeni Polyakov (Rusichi)
Denis Tkachuk (Salyut)
17 goals
Ivan Rodin (Vityaz)
Karen Sargsyan (Avangard)
16 goals
Georgi Smurov (Sokol)
14 goals
Amir Bazhev (Salyut)

South

Standings

Top scorers
Source: rfspro.ru 
19 goals
Mikhail Biryukov (Astrakhan)
16 goals
Artyom Maslevskiy (Taganrog)
15 goals
Valeri Basiyev (Olimpia)
13 goals
Dmitry Mezinov (MITOS)
Denis Pavlov (Torpedo)
Timirlan Shavanov (Dagdizel)
11 goals
Magomed Guguyev (Angusht)
Rustam Khabekirov (Druzhba)
Aslanbek Konov (Kavkaztransgaz-2005)
Sergei Verkashanskiy (Torpedo)
Ruslan Zyazikov (Angusht)

Ural-Povolzhye

Standings

Top scorers
Source: rfspro.ru 
25 goals
Aleksandr Korotayev (Akademiya)
17 goals
Aleksei Sapogov (Gornyak)
16 goals
Yuri Budylin (Neftekhimik)
11 goals
Anton Bobylev (Volga)
Ruslan Galiakberov (Rubin-2)
10 goals
Aleksei Kotlyarov (Neftekhimik)
Oleg Makeyev (Khimik)

East

Standings

Top scorers
Source: rfspro.ru 
18 goals
Sergei Vinogradov (Sakhalin)
16 goals
Yevgeni Alkhimov (Chita)
Vyacheslav Kirillov (Sibiryak / Metallurg-Kuzbass)
13 goals
Andrei Lodis (Smena)
Ivan Shpakov (Metallurg-Kuzbass)
10 goals
Aleksandr Golubev (Metallurg-Kuzbass)
Andrei Volgin (Metallurg-Kuzbass)
9 goals
Anton Bagayev (Irtysh)
Aleksandr Bulanovskiy (Yakutiya)
Ivan Goryunov (Dynamo)
Aleksei Sabanov (Sibiryak)
Yevgeni Shcherbakov (Chita / Irtysh)
Maksim Zhitnev (Sibir-2)

Team names 

In the Russian sports tradition, each team has a proper name written in parentheses followed by the indication of the city it represents in brackets: "Spartak" (Moscow), rather than Moscow Spartak, as would be in the English-language tradition. In English, the parentheses and brackets are usually omitted. Further, while North American team names normally use the plural (Chicago Bulls), Russian team names are usually singular. The names tend to reflect the imagined profession of the team players (or rather their fans, like with Edmonton Oilers), or refer to a geographical object related to the city the team represents (usually, a river or a mountain range), or to one of the former Russian-wide sports associations (Spartak, Dynamo etc.), or else to the sponsoring corporation. Below is the list of Second Division teams with their names translated:

References

External links
Official site 

2011
3
Rus